The New South Wales Minister for Families and Communities is a minister of the Government of New South Wales with responsibility for social policy and welfare, including matters relating to ageing, disability, multiculturalism, and veterans' affairs, women's affairs and youth in the state of New South Wales, Australia.

The current Minister since 21 December 2021 is Natasha Maclaren-Jones who is also the Minister for Disability Services. The Minister is assisted in the administration of her portfolio by the following ministers: 
 the Minister for Women, currently Bronwyn Taylor, since 2 April 2019; 
 the Minister for Veterans, currently David Elliott, since 21 December 2021;
 the Minister for Multiculturalism and Minister for Seniors, currently Mark Coure, since 21 December 2021;
 the Minister for Regional Youth, currently Ben Franklin, since 21 December 2021.

Collectively the ministers administer the portfolio through the Stronger Communities cluster, in particular through the Department of Communities and Justice and a range of other government agencies.

List of ministers

See also 

List of New South Wales government agencies

References

Families and Communities